Joseph or Joe Callahan may refer to:

Joseph M. Callahan (1885–1973), New York politician and judge
Joseph N. Callahan, American swimmer
Joseph R. Callahan (1892–1977), American farmer, businessman, and politician
Joseph Callahan, actor in A La Cabaret
Joe Callahan (ice hockey) (born 1982), American ice hockey player
Joe Callahan (baseball) (1916–1949), American baseball pitcher
Joe Callahan (footballer) (1898–1978), Australian rules footballer
Joe Callahan (American football) (born 1993), American football quarterback

See also
Joe Callanan (born 1949), Irish politician
Joe Callaghan, footballer
Joseph Callaghan (disambiguation)